Faith In What? is a novel by the American writer Richard Krawiec set in 1980s Pittsburgh, Pennsylvania. According to Kirkus Review, it is a "gritty, powerful second novel."

It tells the story of a working-class family, Tim and Pat and their two daughters, struggling with illness and unemployment in the wake of the dramatic collapse of the steel industry.

See also

Time Sharing

References

1996 American novels
Novels set in Pittsburgh
Fiction set in the 1980s